Mitra deprofundis is a species of sea snail, a marine gastropod mollusk in the family Mitridae, the miters or miter snails.

Description

Distribution
This marine species occurs off New Caledonia.

References

 Turner H. (2001). Four new large Mitra species from the Indo-Pacific (Neogastropoda: Muricoidea: Mitridae). Archiv für Molluskenkunde 129 (1-2): 7-23

Mitridae
Gastropods described in 2001